.frl is the Internet top-level domain for Friesland. frl domain names are issued by FRLregistry B.V., which is responsible for the top-level domain '.frl'. On September 1, 2014, the delegation took place and .frl was established. On September 2 the first .frl domain nic.frl went online.

.fy April Fools' Day joke
.fy is a fictional top-level domain of Friesland, as provided on April 1, 2006, as an April Fools' Day joke by the equally fictitious Stichting Internet Domeinnammeregistraasje Fryslân (SIDF).

The reason for its own top-level domain was because it was felt that information in the West Frisian language had to be offered from domains where it could be read from the domain name that it was Frisian information.

See also 
.amsterdam
.cat
.nl
.eu

References

External links 
 Network Information Center (NIC)
 IANA .frl whois information
 ICANN website about new TLDs

Internet in the Netherlands
Mass media in the Netherlands